The La Grange Historic District in La Grange, Tennessee is a  historic district which was listed on the National Register of Historic Places in 1975.

It includes:
Immanuel Church (La Grange, Tennessee) (c. 1843), which is separately listed on the NRHP
La Grange Methodist Church, (c. 1832–36)
Hillcrest (1840), claimed to be "one of the earliest examples of Swiss chalet architecture in America."
Hancock Hall (1857), known for its double portico, one facing south and one facing west
more

References

External links

National Register of Historic Places in Fayette County, Tennessee
Greek Revival architecture in Tennessee
Fayette County, Tennessee